Joseph Trevor Wicks  (born 21 September 1985), also known as The Body Coach, is a British fitness coach, TV presenter, social media personality and author.

His fitness method uses High Intensity Interval Training (HIIT) workouts. Starting off by posting 15-second recipe videos on social media, Wicks grew his brand to become one of the most followed fitness accounts on Instagram and YouTube. His first published cookbook Lean in 15: 15-minute meals was a best-seller in 2015, having sold over 900,000 copies. He has created a "90 Day Plan" with workouts and meals with portions tailored to the individual.

During the COVID-19 pandemic in 2020, he began "PE with Joe" on YouTube to try to help children stay active; this livestream had a wide impact and was viewed by over a million users worldwide. The first stream occurred on 23 March and ended almost one year later; on 5 March. For this, he was awarded his MBE in the Birthday Honours of 2020. He is a Channel 4 television presenter with his own show The Body Coach.

Wicks was awarded a Guinness World Record for "most viewers for a fitness workout live stream on YouTube", after achieving over 950,000 viewers on Tuesday 24 March 2020 for his second live stream. The award was presented to him virtually due to the pandemic.

Early life 
Wicks was born in Epsom, Surrey to Gary Wicks, a roofer, and Raquela Mosquera, a social worker of Italian descent. His maternal grandparents were from the Isle of Man. He grew up on a council estate with his parents and two brothers, Nikki and George.
Wicks attended Blenheim High School in Epsom, Surrey and NESCOT technology college in Epsom. He went on to study sports science at St Mary's University in Twickenham.

Career 
Joe Wicks worked as a teaching assistant after completing his sports science degree. After realising it was not his ideal job, he became a personal trainer for the next five years.

In 2012, he appeared as a contestant on the Channel 4 game show The Bank Job. He went out first after being the only player left in the vault when the time ran out.

Wicks has been a guest on several UK daytime talk shows, including Good Morning Britain, This Morning, Loose Women and Lorraine.

A segment on Channel 4 named Joe Wicks: The Body Coach aired in 2016 with Wicks as the presenter. As of 2020 there have been 3 episodes.

Wicks launched a range of kitchenware in 2018.

Online presence 
Wicks began to gain traction for his fitness and nutrition related content on social media. In 2014 he began posting videos to Instagram relating to workouts and nutrition advice. He has amassed over 4.1 million followers on his Instagram account.

He launched a website called The Body Coach where he sells his kitchenware and a range of fitness/nutrition plans.

Wicks has been recognised by several major publications, such as Harper's Bazaar, Elle UK and Forbes for his online fitness efforts.

YouTube 
He began posting fitness content to his YouTube channel, named 'The Body Coach TV', in 2014. His first video garnered over 6 million views. The channel has amassed over 2.7 million subscribers and more than 282 million views. Wicks also topped both the YouTube charts as the number one trending and breakout creator of the year.

On 19 March 2020 Wicks uploaded a video announcing that he would begin to produce "P.E with Joe" videos on his channel. These videos were exercise videos aimed at children to keep fit during the COVID-19 pandemic as schools were closed. Wicks announced on his Instagram that he will donate profits from these videos to the NHS. He raised approximately £500,000.  

In November 2020, during the second England National Lockdown, he produced a series of videos called “Wake up with Joe”

On January 28, 2023, Joe Wicks hosted a 5K fun run at Nonsuch Park. It was attended by celebrities including fellow YouTube personalities Matthew Houghton and Alex Gurteen.

Books 
In 2015, Wicks published a cookbook named Lean in 15: The Shift Plan which sold 77,000 copies in its opening week. He released a further two books in the Lean in 15 series, including Lean in 15: The Shape Plan, released 2016  and "Lean in 15: The Sustain Plan", also in 2016.

Since the success of the Lean in 15 series, Wicks has published several more cookbooks. His new cookbook, Wean in 15 was released on 14 May  and focuses on 'weaning babies onto solid food and recipes for time-pressed parents'.

Charity 
In November 2020, Wicks completed a 24-hour workout challenge which raised over £2 million for Children in Need. Blue Peter awarded him a Gold Blue Peter Badge as a thank you on behalf of Children in Need.

In June 2021, Wicks became Patron of The Amber Foundation, a youth homeless charity. Surrey-born Wicks first became aware of The Amber Foundation after his mother, a social worker, started to work with some of the residents at their site near Dorking in Surrey. Since then, Wicks has visited the centre on a number of occasions, donating fitness equipment and giving advice on physical activity and nutrition.

Personal life 
Wicks married glamour model Rosie Jones in June 2019. Together they have three children—a daughter born July 2018, a son born December 2019 and a second daughter born September 2022. 

Wicks was appointed Member of the Order of the British Empire (MBE) in the 2020 Birthday Honours for services to fitness and charity.

Bibliography

References

External links 
 

1985 births
Channel 4 people
Living people
Diet food advocates
English food writers
English television chefs
English television presenters
Alumni of St Mary's University, Twickenham
English people of Italian descent
English people of Manx descent
Members of the Order of the British Empire